The 2017 Women's Ford National Hockey League was the 19th edition of the women's field hockey tournament. The competition was held in Wellington, New Zealand from 16–24 September.

The tournament saw an increase to eight teams from the seven that contested the 2016 edition.

Midlands won the title for the second time, defeating Northland 4–2 in the final. Auckland finished third after defeating North Harbour 3–0 in a penalty shoot-out after the third place match finished 1–1.

Participating teams

 Auckland
 Canterbury
 Capital
 Central
 Midlands
 Northland
 North Harbour
 Southern

Results

First round

Pool A

Pool B

Classification round

Quarter-finals

Fifth to eighth place classification

Crossover

Seventh and eighth place

Fifth and sixth place

First to fourth place classification

Semi-finals

Third and fourth place

Final

Statistics

Final standings

Goalscorers

References

Hockey
Ford National Hockey League
New Zealand National Hockey League seasons
Women's field hockey in New Zealand